The Yakutsk electoral district was a constituency created for the 1917 Russian Constituent Assembly election. The electoral district covered the Yakutsk Oblast. Four candidate lists were in the fray; List 1 - Yakutian Labour Union of Federalists, List 2 - Socialist-Revolutionaries, List 3 - Mensheviks and List 4 - Kadets.

As of May 1917 the Menshevik centre had sent M. T. Popov, from the Agitation and Literary Section of the Petrograd Soviet to Yakutsk. Popov was a noted for his rhetorical skills.

Results

References

Electoral districts of the Russian Constituent Assembly election, 1917